St Chad's Church, Longford is a Grade I listed parish church in the Church of England in Longford, Derbyshire.

History

The church dates from the 12th century, with other work from the 14th, 15th and 16th centuries. The tower is 15th century with almost full height buttresses to each corner.

The living of St Chad's was originally in the gift of the Earl of Leicester. This transferred to Arthur Manners when he acquired Longford Hall.

Organ

The two manual, 17 stop pipe organ was installed by I Abbott in 1874. A specification of the organ can be found on the National Pipe Organ Register.

Parish status

The church is in a joint parish with 
St John the Baptist's Church, Boylestone
St Michael and All Angels' Church, Church Broughton
All Saints' Church, Dalbury
Christ Church, Long Lane
St Andrew's Church, Radbourne
St Michael's Church, Sutton-on-the-Hill
All Saints’ Church, Trusley

See also
Grade I listed churches in Derbyshire
Grade I listed buildings in Derbyshire
Listed buildings in Longford, Derbyshire

References

Church of England church buildings in Derbyshire
Grade I listed churches in Derbyshire